Valler is a former station on the Kolsås Line of the Oslo Metro. It was located between Gjettum and Avløs,  from Stortinget.

The station opened on 1 January 1930 as part of the tramway Lilleaker Line.

Along with most of the line, Valler has been closed for upgrades since 1 July 2006 and its service is temporarily provided by bus. The line reopened on 12 October 2014, but it was decided that Valler would not reopen. Instead Gjettum station was moved closer to Valler. Gjettum, among other things, received longer platforms which can accommodate trains with up to six cars like most of the subway system.

References

Oslo Metro stations in Bærum
Railway stations opened in 1930
Railway stations closed in 2006
Disused Oslo Metro stations
1930 establishments in Norway
2006 disestablishments in Norway